{{Speciesbox
| image = Naturalis Biodiversity Center - RMNH.AVES.126675 1 - Hypsipetes virescens sumatranus (Wardlaw Ramsay, 1882) - Pycnonotidae - bird skin specimen.jpeg
| image_caption = Preserved specimen at Naturalis Biodiversity Center
| status = LC
| status_system = IUCN3.1
| status_ref = <ref name=iucn>{{cite iucn |author=BirdLife International. |year=2017 |title=Ixos sumatranus |volume=2017 |page=e.T103823086A113106779 |doi=10.2305/IUCN.UK.2017-1.RLTS.T103823086A113106779.en |access-date=23 July 2021}}</ref>
| taxon = Ixos sumatranus
| authority = (Wardlaw-Ramsay, 1882)
| range_map = 
| synonyms = 
}}

The Sumatran bulbul (Ixos sumatranus''''') is a species of songbird in the bulbul family, Pycnonotidae.
It is endemic to Sumatra (Indonesia).

References

Sumatran bulbul
Birds of Sumatra
Sumatran bulbul
Sumatran bulbul

Endemic fauna of Sumatra